Richard Burgess may refer to:

Rick Burgess (radio personality), comedy/talk radio host in Alabama, part of Rick and Bubba
Richard Burgess (murderer) (1829–1866), murderer in New Zealand
Richard Burgess (footballer) (born 1974), English soccer player
Richard James Burgess (born 1949), British record producer
Richard Burgess (biblical scholar)  (1796–1881), archaeologist and biblical scholar

See also
Richard Burges (disambiguation)
Dick Burgess (Daniel Burgess, 1896–1983), English footballer
Dick Burgess, a character on The Van Dyke Show